Second Creek is a stream in Kanawha County, West Virginia. It is a tributary of the Pocatalico River.

First Creek was the second nearest creek to a pioneer settlement, hence the name.

See also
List of rivers of West Virginia

References

Rivers of Kanawha County, West Virginia
Rivers of West Virginia